The Abiru (Kinyarwanda: royal ritualists) are the members of the privy council of the monarchy of Rwanda. They emanate from the earliest pre-colonial Rwandan traditions, and are tied to the monarchy's mythic origins. Due to the mythopoetic nature of accounts of the early history of the Abiru and the Rwandan monarchy, an accurate history of the Abiru is difficult to codify or study. 

The council as a whole can be described as a priestly body that elects, advises and/or deposes Rwandan kings.
Debate continues over the pre-colonial functions of the body, which makes definite statements on the subject speculatory at best.

The wider ethnic community that is traditionally expected to provide the membership of the council is also known as the Abiru. Both the council and this community are currently led by Boniface Benzinge.

An Excerpt From The Oral Records Of Rwanda

Functions
The Abiru function as advisors to the king in political matters, and may or may not have a political role assigned to them. Their primary function as a group is to determine the continuing suitability of the king in terms of ritual and political function. Historically, the Abiru depose 'unworthy' kings and proclaim successors based on secretive ritual practices, acting as a fons honorum for Rwanda.

The chairman of the Royal Council of Abiru  is the de facto prime minister of Rwanda's monarchy; the current incumbent served at the pleasure of Kigeli V, and now serves - along with the rest of the council - the reigning king-in-exile Emmanuel Bushayija, who was proclaimed Yuhi VI in 2017.

When thought of as an ethnic group, the class of elite families that has provided members of the Royal Council of Abiru for centuries on a hereditary basis is also referred to as Abiru. Although sometimes thought of as being a distinct community, the Abiru are traditionally considered to be part of the wider Tutsi ethnicity. A Burundian near-analogue would be the Ganwa.

Famous Abiru
 Alexis Kagame
 Boniface Benzinge

See also
History of Rwanda
Kingdom of Rwanda
List of presidents of Rwanda
Prime Minister of Rwanda

References

History of Rwanda
Rwandan monarchy
African traditional governments
African nobility